Ardhito Rifqi Pramono (born May 22, 1995) is an Indonesian singer, songwriter and actor.  Apart from being a singer, Ardhito has been a creative planner and also a music director. He has also been involved in working on several short films and web-series.

Early life

Ardhito Rifqi Pramono was born in Jakarta, Indonesia on May 22, 1995. He has a younger sister named Adhania Pramono. Pramono was always interested in music since he was a child and he has since been a jazz lover and a fan of 40s songs. More than just composing songs, he can also play musical instruments such as the guitar, piano and drums. He started composing music since 2013, when he was still studying at JMC Academy, Australia, in the Film Department. After graduating from JMC Academy, Pramono worked at his father's company which worked on aircraft maintenance. A year later, Pramono was selected as Top 6 MTV Indonesia VJ Hunt.

Career
Pramono first appeared on YouTube in 2013 when he covered AJ Rafael's songs such as She Was Mine. A year later after graduating from college, in 2014 to be precise, he began to gain popularity. His first single was titled I Placed My Heart, which was then followed by the song What Do You Feel About Me. The second song became one of the most watched songs on YouTube. He stated that "because YouTube is the most used platform for playing / searching for new music". Apart from being a singer, Pramono also worked at TV stations, as a DJ and a barista before deciding to become a full-time musician.

Personal life
Pramono is married to Indonesian model Jeanneta Sanfadelia (b. June 8, 1998), on 2019. They had a one daughter named Asmara Pramono.

On January 12, 2022, Pramono was arrested by police and taken into custody due to alleged possession and consumption of marijuana was sent to rehabilitation for six months.

On July 29, 2022, a scandalous video of masturbated man suspected for being Pramono, spread on Twitter.

Discography

Album 
 Ardhito Pramono (2017)
 Playlist, Vol. 2 (2017)
 A letter to my 17-year-old (2019)
 Craziest thing happened in my backyard (2020)

Single 
 I Placed My Heart
 What Do You Feel About Me
 I Can't Stop Loving You
 Tjumbuan Kasih Limba Lara
 Perlahan Menghilang (with Joan Elizabeth)
 Di Senayan
 Bulb
 The Sun
 The Message
 Malam Minggu di Jakarta (with Prilly Latuconsina)
 Bila (OST. Susah Sinyal)
 Fake Optics
 bitterlove
 say hello
 superstar
 cigarettes of ours
 fine today (OST. Nanti Kita Cerita tentang Hari Ini)
 Trash Talkin'''
 925 Here We Go Again / Fanboi Plaza Avenue Happy Sudah (OST. Story of Kale: When Someone's in Love)I Just Couldn't Save You Tonight (bersama Aurélie Moeremans)(OST. Story of Kale: When Someone's in Love)''

Filmography

Awards and nominations

References 

1995 births
Living people
Indonesian male singers
English-language singers from Indonesia
Singers from Jakarta
Indonesian actors